= List of South American countries by population growth rate =

The list is based on CIA World Factbook estimates. Countries or dependent territories without a 2017 estimate are omitted.

== List ==
CIA World Factbook (2017)

Rank	Country	Annual growth (%)
1	Bolivia	1.51
2	Ecuador	1.28
3	Venezuela	1.24
4	Paraguay	1.18
5	Suriname	1.02
6	Colombia	0.99
7	Peru	0.95
8	Argentina	0.91
9	Chile	0.77
10	Brazil	0.73
11	Guyana	0.32
12	Uruguay	0.27
